Michael B. First (born 1956) is an American psychiatrist who focuses on diagnostic criteria for mental disorders. He is Professor of Clinical Psychiatry at Columbia University. First was one of the editors of DSM-IV-TR, the Editor of Text and Criteria for the DSM-IV, and the editor of the Structured Clinical Interview for DSM-IV.  He also served as consultant to the World Health Organization for the revision of ICD-11.

Life and career
First earned a bachelor's degree in Electrical Engineering and Computer Science from Princeton University in 1978. He then graduated from University of Pittsburgh with a master's degree, also in Computer Science, and a Doctor of Medicine degree in 1983. He did his psychiatric residency at Columbia-Presbyterian Medical Center and a fellowship in biometrics at the New York State Psychiatric Institute. He is certified with the American Board of Psychiatry & Neurology.

First frequently writes on diagnostic criteria, particularly diagnostic controversies. He has written on several of these controversies, including depression, eating disorders, and desire for amputation or paralysis, calling it body integrity identity disorder.

He has provided expert opinion and testimony on several high-profile cases, including the federal trial of the accused Al Qaeda terrorist Zacarias Moussaoui. First co-authored Am I Okay?: A Layman's Guide to the Psychiatrist's Bible with psychiatrist Allen Frances.

Selected publications

Kupfer DA, First MB, Regier DA (2002). A Research Agenda for DSM-V.  American Psychiatric Publishing, 
First MB, Pincus HA, Levine JB, Williams JB, Ustun B, Peele R (2004). Clinical utility as a criterion for revising psychiatric diagnoses. Am J Psychiatry. 2004 Jun;161(6):946-54. 
Crawford TN, Cohen P, Johnson JG, Kasen S, First MB, Brook JS (2005). Self-Reported Personality Disorder in the Children in the Community Sample: Convergent and Prospective Validity in Late Adolescence and Adulthood. J Pers Disord. 2005 Feb;19(1):30-52. 
First MB (2005). Desire for Amputation of a Limb: Paraphilia, Psychosis, or a New Type of Identity Disorder. Psychological Medicine, 2005, 35:919-928. 
First MB, Westen D (2007). Classification for clinical practice: how to make ICD and DSM better able to serve clinicians. International Review of Psychiatry.  2007;19: 473-481. 
First MB, Spitzer RL, Williams JBW, Gibbon M: Structured Clinical Interview for DSM-IV (SCID-I) - Research Version,  Biometrics Research,  New York,  NY,  USA
First MB (2010). DSM-5 Proposals for Paraphilias: Suggestions for Reducing False Positives Related to Use of Behavioral Manifestations. Arch Sex Behav, 2010 Aug 10, 
Kendler KS, First MB (2010). Alternative futures for the DSM revision process: iteration v. paradigm shift. Br J Psychiatry. 2010 Oct;197(4):263-5.

See also
 Robert Spitzer

References

External links
Michael First, M.D. via Columbia University Medical Center
Structured Clinical Interview for DSM-IV

1956 births
Living people
American psychiatrists
Columbia University faculty